Encrucijada (English title:Crossroads) is a Mexican telenovela produced by Televisa and transmitted by Telesistema Mexicano in 1970.

Cast 
Irán Eory as Susan Harrison
Jacqueline Andere as Wendy Kepler
Enrique Aguilar as Fred
Liliana Durán as Lidia
Queta Lavat
Ruben Rojo

References

External links 

Mexican telenovelas
1970 telenovelas
Televisa telenovelas
Spanish-language telenovelas
Television shows based on comics
1970 Mexican television series debuts
1970 Mexican television series endings